Antiochis was one of the ten tribes (phylai) into which the Ancient Athenians were divided.

Location and history
Is named after Antiochus, son of Heracles and  Meda.

Antiochis comprised 13 demes: Aigilia (Aỉγιλía), Alopeke, Amphitrope, Anaphlystos, Atene, Besa,  Eitea, Eroiadai, Kolonai, Krioa, Pallene, Semachidai, and Thorai.

Phalerum was a harbour belonging to the tribe. From this harbour the voyages of Theseus and Menestheus were said to have begun, for Crete and Troy respectively.

Socrates  belonged to this tribe. The tribe was in possession of the prytany in the Council, at the time of the events concerning the ten generals active for Athens' navy in the battle of Arginusae.

Aristeides was in command of this tribe's contingent during the Battle of Marathon.

References

Tribes of ancient Attica